Koordi is a village in Paide (urban municipality), Järva County, in northern-central Estonia. Prior to the 2017 administrative reform in Estonia of local governments, it was located in Roosna-Alliku Parish. 

Koordi was the formal location of Hans Leberecht's 1948 book Valgus Koordis (Light in Koordi). In 1950 a film with the same name was made.

References

 

Villages in Järva County